Vesta 4 U is the second studio album by American R&B singer Vesta Williams, released on November 21, 1988 on A&M Records.

Commercial performance
The album peaked at No. 131 on the Billboard 200 and 26 on Top R&B Albums chart. Four singles were released from the album, with three reaching R&B top ten. "Sweet, Sweet Love" and "Congratulations" were both R&B hits, peaking top five on Billboards Hot R&B Singles chart. Williams scored her only charting pop song with "Congratulations", peaking to number 55 on the Billboard Hot 100.

Track listing

Charts

Weekly charts

Year-end charts

Singles

References

External links
 

1988 albums
Vesta Williams albums
A&M Records albums